The Lockheed XP-58 Chain Lightning was an American long-range fighter developed during World War II. Although derived from the successful P-38 Lightning, the XP-58 was plagued by technical problems with its engines that eventually led to the project's cancellation.

Design and development
The XP-58 was a Lockheed Aircraft Company funded initiative to develop an improved Lightning as a long-range fighter following the release by the U.S. Army Air Corps of the Lightning for sale to Britain on 20 April 1940. Initially, two designs were formulated, both using the Continental IV-1430 engines. One would be a single-seat aircraft with one 20 mm (.79 in) cannon and four .50 in (12.7 mm) machine guns. The second would be a two-seat aircraft with the addition of a flexible .50 in (12.7 mm) gun at the end of each tail boom.

In July 1940, Lockheed decided to switch to Pratt & Whitney XH-2600 engines as the aircraft would be underpowered with the Continental engines, with the aircraft having two seats and designated "XP-58". However, soon Lockheed was advised the development of the XH-2600 engine was terminated. After consideration of the engine alternatives, the design was changed to use two Wright R-2160 Tornado engines, as well as a change of the rear-facing armament to two turrets, one upper and the other lower on the fuselage, each turret containing two .50 in (12.7 mm) machine guns.

In March 1942, the USAAF placed an order for a second XP-58 that would incorporate increased fuel tanks to obtain a range of 3,000 mi (4,800 km). The Air Force was uncertain about the role and armament of the aircraft, and in September 1942, a decision was made to convert the aircraft for a role as a low-altitude attack aircraft, armed with a 75 mm (2.95 in) M5 autocannon. Adequate aircraft were already available for this mission, with the Douglas A-26 Invader and Beechcraft XA-38 Grizzly under development. As a result, the second XP-58 was canceled and the role of the design reverted to that of a high-altitude fighter, using large-bore cannon firing high-explosive shells to break up bomber formations.

The 37 mm (1.46 in) M4 autocannon was originally selected for a quadruple mount in the nose, but the trajectory of the 37mm shells dropped lower than other weaponry, limiting its effective range. A hydraulically articulated nose that could be bent up to correct this problem was tried, but was dismissed as too complex. Then, a 75 mm (2.95 in) M5 autocannon paired with twin .50 in (12.7 mm) machine guns was tried and proved much more successful.

Testing
In February 1943, use of another engine, the Allison V-3420, was necessary due to poor progress with the Tornado engine development. With this change, the second XP-58 was resurrected. The XP-58 had its first flight on 6 June 1944, but flight test work on the XP-58 took second place to other higher priority developments. Eventually, 25 test flights were completed. The XP-58 was then flown to Wright Field for USAAF acceptance tests, even though the turbo-superchargers were experiencing torching and a number of systems were not installed including provision for cockpit pressurization and armament with its fire-control equipment. Although the prototype arrived at Wright Field on 22 October 1944, the aircraft was a maintenance headache and no further trials were conducted. The construction of the second prototype was abandoned.

Specifications (XP-58)

See also

References

Notes

Bibliography

 Francillon, René J. Lockheed Aircraft since 1913. London: Putnam, 1982. .
 Green, William. War Planes of the Second World War, Volume Four: Fighters. London: MacDonald & Co. (Publishers) Ltd., 1961 (Sixth impression 1969). .
 Green, William and Gordon Swanborough. WW2 Aircraft Fact Files: US Army Air Force Fighters, Part 2. London: Macdonald and Jane's Publishers Ltd., 1978. .

P-058
Twin-boom aircraft
Lockheed P-58
Mid-wing aircraft
Aircraft first flown in 1944
Twin piston-engined tractor aircraft